The Court Street School is located in Freehold Borough, Monmouth County, New Jersey, United States. The building was built in 1921 and was added to the National Register of Historic Places on August 4, 1995.

See also
National Register of Historic Places listings in Monmouth County, New Jersey

References

Colonial Revival architecture in New Jersey
School buildings completed in 1921
Buildings and structures in Monmouth County, New Jersey
School buildings on the National Register of Historic Places in New Jersey
National Register of Historic Places in Monmouth County, New Jersey
Freehold Borough, New Jersey
New Jersey Register of Historic Places
1921 establishments in New Jersey